Hezarfen Airfield  is a privately owned airport for general aviation in the Çatalca district of Istanbul, Turkey. One of the four airports in Istanbul, it is named after Hezârfen Ahmet Çelebi, a legendary Ottoman aviator, who flew across the Bosporus in the 17th century, as told by a contemporary traveler Evliya Çelebi.

The  airfield is on a peninsula surrounded by Lake Büyükçekmece to the south and by the motorway  to the north. Since 1992, it has served as the first internationally acknowledged private airport in Turkey.

There are four taxiways parallel to the runway, a  concrete ramp, and another  paved one.

Hezarfen Hobbyland 

The airfield, called also "Hezarfen Hobbyland", offers facilities for model aircraft flying, model car racing, motocross racing, drag racing (cars and motorcycles), car and driver testing and flight simulation.

In addition to "Istanbul Aviation Festival" held each year in  June, the Hezarfen Airfield hosts also the open air music festival Rock'n Coke, held since 2003 annually in September for two days attracting around 30,000 music fans.

The airfield is home to an aviation school training air traffic controllers, fixed-wing aircraft and helicopter pilots. Turkey's only civil aerobatics school and team is also based here. Another school at the site is for training motorcycle racing.

Other social facilities offered by the Hezarfen Hobbyland are a restaurant and premises for business conventions, fairs and exhibitions. Its public recreational area include also a  playground for children, a skateboarding ground, and a  course around the airfield for jogging and biking, in addition to a picnic and barbecue ground.

Gallery

See also 
 Istanbul Airport
 Istanbul Sabiha Gökçen International Airport
 Istanbul Atatürk International Airport
 Istanbul Samandıra Air Base

References

External links 
 Hezarfen Airfield official website
 hezarfen Airport at the Airport Guide

Hezarfen
Heliports in Turkey
Model airplane fields
Music venues in Istanbul
Motorsport venues in Turkey
Sports venues in Istanbul
Entertainment venues in Istanbul
Büyükçekmece
Buildings and structures in Istanbul Province
Transport in Istanbul Province
Privately owned airports